Latham Coddington (2 February 1772 – 14 January  1860) was an Anglican priest in Ireland.

Coddington was born in County Meath and educated at Trinity College, Dublin.  He was Dean of Kilfenora  from 1796 until 1802. when he became the Vicar of Timolin, a post he held until his death. He was a Prebendary of Timothan in St Patrick's Cathedral, Dublin from 1809 until 1844.

References

Deans of Kilfenora
18th-century Irish Anglican priests
19th-century Irish Anglican priests
People from County Meath
1772 births
1860 deaths
Alumni of Trinity College Dublin